Wonder Girls was a South Korean girl group formed by JYP Entertainment. The group debuted in February 2007 with the single "Irony" and 5 members: Yeeun, Sunye, Sunmi, Hyuna and Sohee. After Hyuna's departure in July, Yubin was added into the group prior to the release of their debut studio album, The Wonder Years (2007). The album spawned the hit single "Tell Me," which topped various South Korea's on and offline music charts.

Wonder Girls further established themselves as one of the top girl groups in the country with the hit singles "So Hot" and "Nobody," released in 2008. After being released as a single in the U.S. in 2009, "Nobody" charted at No. 76 on the Billboard Hot 100, making Wonder Girls the first South Korean act to enter the chart. The group began their entry into the American market the same year as an opening act for the Jonas Brothers' World Tour, performing English versions of their songs.

In 2010, Sunmi left the group to pursue an academic career and was replaced by Hyerim prior to the Korean & US releases of the single "2 Different Tears." Their second studio album, Wonder World (2011), yielded the successful single "Be My Baby." In 2012, Wonder Girls starred in the TeenNick movie The Wonder Girls, and released their last 3 singles as a quintet, notably "Like This" and "Like Money," before going on a 3-year long hiatus. In 2015, it was announced that Sunye and Sohee decided to leave the group while Sunmi would resume promotion with the remaining members. The 4-piece adapted a band-oriented concept for their acclaimed third and final studio album, Reboot (2015), and the No. 1 2016 single "Why So Lonely."

Wonder Girls are also known as "South Korea's Retro Queens," as their music has been noted to contain elements from the 1960s through 80s. In 2017, Billboard ranked Wonder Girls at No. 3 on their "Top 10 K-pop Girl Groups of the Past Decade" list. The group officially disbanded on January 26, 2017, after unsuccessful contract renewal negotiation with some of its members. On February 10, 2017, they released their final single "Draw Me," which also served as a celebration of their 10th anniversary.

History

2006–07: MTV Wonder Girls, debut and line-up changes

After Park Jin-young revealed the name of his first girl group Wonder Girls in May 2006, the Wonder Girls were introduced through a TV show titled MTV Wonder Girls. The first four episodes outlined the characteristics and profiles of each member. Shortly after selecting Yeeun as the fifth member, the Wonder Girls held their first showcase in the MTV Studio. They performed a cover version of "Don't Cha" by the Pussycat Dolls as well as original songs, including "Irony" and "" ("It's Not Love"). Sunye sang her version of Destiny's Child's "Stand Up for Love", while Hyuna performed a showcase of her dancing skills. The other three members—Yeeun, Sunmi and Sohee—performed a cover version of Janet Jackson's "Together Again".

The Wonder Girls officially debuted in early 2007 on MBC's Show! Music Core, performing "Irony", the hip-hop single from their first album, The Wonder Begins. The album sold 11,454 physical copies in 2007. Shortly after, "Wonderfuls", the official Wonder Girls fanclub, was established. The group held several showcases in China after receiving Chinese lessons. In mid-2007, however, members of the Wonder Girls were beset by various injuries and health problems. On June 25, Sohee was sidelined for a month after tearing a knee ligament in a fall from a running motorcycle during the filming of the movie 뜨거운 것이 좋아 (I Like It Hot).

The remaining four members continued performing until late July, when Hyuna was withdrawn from the group by her parents due to their concern over her problems with chronic gastroenteritis and fainting spells. In autumn 2007, the talent agency Good Entertainment sent their trainee Yubin to JYP Entertainment as a replacement for Hyuna. She made her debut three days later in the group's live performance of "Tell Me" on Music Bank.

Their first full-length album, The Wonder Years, was released the following week with "Tell Me" as the lead single. Due to the last-minute addition of Yubin, the album version does not contain her part. However, the performance version of the song was reworked to include a bridge with rapping by Yubin. The single was a hit and reached number one on various Korean television and internet music charts, including KBS's Music Bank. The song also became a number one hit in Thailand. The choreography for the song was simple and widely imitated: by October, many fan performances of the dance circulated on video sharing sites such as YouTube and Daum, including one by a group of policemen who were eventually profiled on SBS's Star King. The dance's popularity it received became widely known as the "Tell Me Virus". The Wonder Girls had an extensive promotional schedule for their album, and in late 2007 they began performing their second single, "이 바보" ("This Fool"). MTV also began broadcasting The Wonder Life, a reality TV series starring the girls.

2008: Breakthrough
In February 2008, the Wonder Girls joined their producer Park Jin-young for his month-long concert tour through Korea and the United States as special guests, where they filmed the music video for "Wishing on a Star" while in New York. "So Hot" was released on May 22, 2008. The song topped online charts soon after. In mid-2008, they performed on MBC's Show! Music Core, performing "So Hot" and "This Time". Due to a vocal cord injury, Yubin temporarily lip-synced her parts under doctor's orders.

After a very short break, the Wonder Girls made a comeback in early fall 2008. The music video for "Nobody" was revealed, and the single was released simultaneously. They performed the following weekend on Show! Music Core, Music Bank and Inkigayo. The song went to No. 1 on KBS' Music Bank, staying there for four consecutive weeks, and also won Cyworld's "Song of the Month" award in September and October 2008. Like "Tell Me", "Nobody" also sparked a dance craze.

At the 2008 Mnet KM Music Festival Awards, the Wonder Girls received three awards: the "Song of the Year" award, "Best Music Video" for "Nobody" and "Best Female Group".<ref name=mkmf>{{cite web|url=http://www.hankyung.com/news/app/newsview.php?aid=2008111638117&sid=01073305&nid=007&ltype=1&pkind=all |title='MKMF 3관왕' 원더걸스 "변치 않는 원더걸스 되겠다" |trans-title=MKMF Triple Winner Wonder Girls "Will Never Change" |last=Kim |first=Shi-eun |website=HanKyung.com |date=November 16, 2008 |access-date=November 16, 2008 |url-status=dead |archive-url=https://web.archive.org/web/20120214022924/http://www.hankyung.com/news/app/newsview.php?aid=2008111638117&sid=01073305&nid=007&ltype=1&pkind=all |archive-date=February 14, 2012 }}</ref> The group also won an award at the 2008 Golden Disk Awards for high digital sales. At the 18th Seoul Music Awards, the Wonder Girls won the Daesang ("Artist of the Year" award), the highest award offered, for "Nobody", in addition to two other awards.

In October 2008, the Wonder Girls were signed by the Creative Artists Agency (CAA). By the end of 2008, they had earned ₩12 billion ($9 million US) as a group.

2009–10: Focus on international activities, touring and line-up changes

The Wonder Girls tour began on February 28, 2009, in Bangkok, Thailand. Along with their mentor, JYP, they held concerts throughout the United States. The group then returned to South Korea, holding concerts in late March in Seoul and Busan. This tour was documented in the M.net reality show Welcome to Wonderland. Following the tour, the Wonder Girls debuted a music video for "Now", a cover of the Fin.K.L single.

In March 2009, the Wonder Girls confirmed that the group would launch in an English-language music career in the United States with the official release of an English version of "Nobody" in summer 2009. It was later announced that the release would be followed by an English version of "Tell Me", and that an English album would be forthcoming. In June 2009, JYP Entertainment announced that the Wonder Girls would be joining the Jonas Brothers on the North American leg of the Jonas Brothers World Tour 2009. In order to concentrate on their American debut, both Sohee and Sunmi had dropped out of high school.Han, Sang-hee. "Two Members of Wonder Girls Quit School for US Debut" . The Korea Times. June 15, 2009. Retrieved June 18, 2009. The English version of "Nobody" was released on June 26, 2009, the day before the start of their tour with the Jonas Brothers. The Wonder Girls were initially signed on for 13 concert dates across the US, but they were eventually given the opportunity to join the Jonas Brothers for a total of 45 concert dates. "Nobody" entered the Billboard Hot 100 in October 2009, making them the first Korean group to enter the chart. The song also topped the Taiwan and Hong Kong music charts.

On January 22, 2010, JYP announced that Sunmi would be postponing her musical career to pursue an academic career and that Hyerim, a JYP trainee, would take her place. 선미, 원더걸스 탈퇴 왜? "Why Did Sunmi eave Wonder Girls?'". JoongAng Ilbo. January 23, 2010. Retrieved January 22, 2010. Sunmi continued to work as a participating member of the Wonder Girls in through February in order to complete scheduled events. Sunmi's departure put many of the group's American plans into disarray. The Wonder Girls had been preparing an English album, with six tracks to consist of English versions of Korean singles and the other half of brand new material, initially scheduled for release in February 2010. They were also planning to have a headlining tour in January 2010; however, due to the departure of Sunmi, plans for the tour were delayed and the album was eventually scrapped.

On April 5, 2010, the Wonder Girls announced a 20-show tour of the US and Canada, dubbed "The Wonder World Tour", which included fellow label mates 2PM for nine dates in conjunction with Live Nation. The tour consisted of a combination of the English and Korean versions of their hits, covers of popular English-language songs, and new songs from their then-upcoming album. The first leg of the tour began in Washington, D.C. on June 4, 2010. The tour was eventually extended to add an additional leg in which label mates, 2AM, would open for the group during certain dates.

The Wonder Girls followed up their tour announcement with the unveiling of their latest EP, titled "2 Different Tears". The title track was recorded in Chinese, Korean and English. The music video for "2 Different Tears" premiered on YouTube on May 15, 2010; it was shot in the Gyeonggi-do province of South Korea. The music video includes Park Jin-young and the Korean-American comedian Bobby Lee. The EP was released on the same day.

Between May 15 and 31, 2010, the Wonder Girls returned to South Korea to promote the Korean version of "2 Different Tears". They appeared on M.Net's M! Countdown on May 22, 2010. On May 27, the Wonder Girls won their first No. 1 award for "2 Different Tears" on M! Countdown. The group ended their last week of promotional activities in South Korea by performing on MBC's Music Core on May 29, 2010. During this two-week period, the Wonder Girls also appeared on several Korean variety and talk shows, including KBS's Win Win and Happy Together, as well as SBS's Family Outing 2 and MBC's Come to Play.

On July 29, MTV Korea premiered season 4 of Wonder Girls, which introduced the Wonder Girls' everyday life in the United States, such as at their New York home and studio, and preparations for the MTV World Stage Live in Malaysia 2010. The MTV World Stage Live in Malaysia 2010 was held at the Sunway Lagoon Surf Beach on July 31, and the show was broadcast on August 21 on MTV Asia. On July 30, M.net premiered a new show Made in Wonder Girls that took viewers behind the scenes of the group's first American tour as well as their promotions in Singapore and Indonesia. On August 3, the Wonder Girls performed in Singapore's SINGfest 2010 at Fort Canning Park.

2011–12: Wonder World and further international ventures

In January 2011, more information was released about the English-language album. JYP Entertainment's CEO Park Jin-young hinted on his Twitter account that he had written a new song for the group while recording in the drama Dream High and later tweeted that other producers were involved in producing the album. Rainstone of JYP Entertainment said that the album was expected to have six to seven tracks. Producer Rodney "Darkchild" Jerkins and the Grammy-nominated singer-songwriter Claude Kelly were revealed to be participating in the album and that the album was to be released by one of the three major labels of America.

On June 30, it was announced on their official website that the girls had been invited to perform at the 2011 Special Olympics closing ceremonies in Athens, Greece. They performed the traditional Korean folk song "Arirang" along with "Nobody" sung in English and "Tell Me" sung in Korean. On August 5, The Wonder Girls appeared on Billboard.com's Mashup Monday program, performing a self-arranged cover version of B.o.B and Bruno Mars' "Nothin' on You". On October 9, 2011, a representative revealed, "The [English-language] album will be produced in a movie OST format. We'll be planning our concept to fit around the feel of the song, so as opposed to retro, we feel that it will be more pop. The Wonder Girls will definitely be coming out with a new image, so please look forward to it."

On October 23, JYP revealed a new poster, "R U Ready?", hanging over their company's building with a new version of the Wonder Girls' logo. Wonder World was announced as the group's second full-length album and was released on November 7, 2011 along with the single "Be My Baby". The album featured more writing and production input from the group members. Promotions for Wonder World began with a comeback stage on Music Bank on November 11 and continued through January 2012.

The group returned to American activities with their made-for-TV movie The Wonder Girls in early 2012. "The DJ Is Mine," an English-language song featuring School Gyrls, was released as a promotional tie-in single for the movie on January 11. "The DJ Is Mine" reached number one on several Korean charts. The movie premiered on February 2 on the TeenNick channel, and featured the then-unreleased English song "Like Money". Following the release of the movie, the group received proposals from major broadcasting companies in the United States, and were in talks concerning full U.S. promotions and activities for their debut English-language album. The twelve-track album was said to have been completed and was scheduled for a summer 2012 release.

In June 2012, the group made a Korean comeback. The group released their mini-album Wonder Party on June 3, 2012. The album's lead single, "Like This", premiered on the same day. In mid-June, it was announced that the group would be making their debut in Japan under DefStar Records, with a release of a Japanese-language version of "Nobody". The single release was called "Nobody for Everybody" and was released on July 25.

On July 10, 2012, a new version of "Like Money" that featured Akon was released as a single in the United States, in what would become their last completely English-language release as a group. In early September 2012, the group performed three new songs from their then-upcoming English-language album at an iHeartRadio concert. On October 29, 2012, Wonder Girls participated in a joint-interview with Nick Cannon in which they discussed the release of their English-language album as well as a new show showcasing the Wonder Girls as a spin-off from their original movie. On November 14, Wonder Girls released the compilation album Wonder Best in Japan, which included a new song, updated versions of older hit songs, and Japanese versions of their songs.

2013–14: Group hiatus, Sunye and Sohee's departure
Sunye announced in November 2012 that she would get married in January 2013; JYP announced that the group would go on hiatus. The Wonder Girls performed for the last time before their hiatus at the Winter Special Olympics in Pyeong Chang, South Korea on February 5, 2013.

Sunye gave birth to a daughter in October 2013. JYP Entertainment denied Sunye's retirement from the group and stated that she would still remain as a member regardless of her inactive status. In December 2013, Sohee left JYP Entertainment and signed with KeyEast Entertainment to focus on an acting career. In December 2014, Sunye officially retired from entertaining, shifting her focus to her family and missionary work in Haiti with her husband. Due to the departures, plans for the English-language album, an English television series, as well as any future promotions in the United States were entirely scrapped.

In August 2013, former member Sunmi debuted as a solo artist with the release of the single "24 Hours". In the following year, she released her debut EP entitled Full Moon. On July 23, 2014, it was announced that Yeeun would be making her debut as solo artist under the pseudonym Ha:tfelt (amalgamation of the pronunciation of the word "Hot" and "Heartfelt"). Her debut mini-album Me? was released on July 31, 2014.

2015: Line-up changes and comeback with Reboot

On June 24, 2015, JYP Entertainment announced that the Wonder Girls would be making a comeback after a three-year hiatus. A representative of the agency confirmed that former member Sunmi would re-join the group for the first time since withdrawing in 2010. Rather than a dance group, the Wonder Girls returned as a four-member band with each member playing an instrument: Yubin (drums), Yeeun (keyboard), Hyerim (guitar), and Sunmi (bass). Their comeback featured a retro, 1980s sound resonant throughout the album, similar to some of their past releases. On August 2, "I Feel You", the lead single from album, was released. The group released the album, titled Reboot on August 3. The album was a commercial success, charting number five on Gaon Albums Chart and number two on Billboard World Albums. Each member participated in the composition and production of the album.

On October 2, it was announced that the Wonder Girls would host an episode of Saturday Night Live Korea. They performed their hits "I Feel You", "Nobody", and "Tell Me". On December 27, they performed at SBS Gayo Daejeon, and on December 31 at 2015 MBC Gayo Daejejeon. Reboot was ranked No. 1 on The 10 Best K-Pop Albums of 2015 by Billboard, and also No. 18 on The 20 Best Albums of 2015 by FuseTV.

2016–17: Why So Lonely and disbandment

In mid-2016, the group started promoting their upcoming single. On June 18, they released one of its B-sides, titled "To the Beautiful You". On July 5, the Wonder Girls released the song "Why So Lonely", with "To the Beautiful You" and "Sweet & Easy" serving as B-sides, as a CD and as a digital single. The single was commercially successful in South Korea—the digital download topped the Gaon Digital Chart. On July 12, the group performed the dance version of Why So Lonely for the first time on SBS MTV's The Show, winning the trophy for that week. This was their first win on a music program since the release of "Like This" in 2012. The group also performed the song at the launch ceremony for the South Korean Olympic team on July 19.

On January 26, 2017, JYP Entertainment announced that Wonder Girls were disbanding, with only Yubin and Hyerim renewing their contracts while Yeeun and Sunmi decided to leave the company. The group released their final single "Draw Me" on February 10; it also serves as a celebration for their 10th anniversary since debut.

Artistry and influences

Musical styles
The Wonder Girls are known for their signature retro sound and concept. Their music has been noted to contain elements from the 1960s, 1970s and 1980s. The Wonder Girls are known as "South Korea's Retro Queens", as their music has been noted to contain elements from the 1960s, such as in their hit "Nobody", 1970s, such as in the reggae track "Why So Lonely", and 1980s, heard on the songs "Tell Me", "So Hot", "2 Different Tears", "Be My Baby" and "I Feel You". Their music videos also allude to vintage fashion and performance, with "Nobody" being mostly inspired by African-American 1960s culture and famous R&B group The Supremes, while "I Feel You" takes place in 1987 and shows the members playing their own instruments and various other scenes with heavy 1980s inspiration.

Band members

The group consisted of five members at the time of its debut in 2007: Sunye, Sohee, Hyuna, Sunmi and Yeeun. Shortly after, in the same year, Hyuna left the group due to concerns over her health, which led to the addition of Yubin as replacement. In 2010, Sunmi left the group to pursue an academic career, and trainee Hyerim was selected as her replacement. Sohee departed from the group in late 2013 following the expiration of her contract with JYP Entertainment, while Sunye left the group in late 2014; their departures were officially announced in July 2015. For the group's 2015 comeback, Sunmi returned to the group, and served as a member alongside Yeeun, Yubin, and Hyerim; the Wonder Girls remained as four-piece band until their disbandment in 2017.

Final members
Yubin – rapper, vocalist, drums 
Yeeun – leader, vocalist, keyboards 
Sunmi – dancer, vocalist, bass guitar 
Hyerim – rapper, vocals,  guitar 

Former members
Hyuna – rapper,  dancer, vocalist 
Sohee – dancer, vocalist 
Sunye – leader, vocals,dancer 

Timeline

Discography

 The Wonder Years (2007)
 Wonder World (2011)
 Reboot'' (2015)

Filmography

Film

Television

Tours

Headlining
 1st Wonder Tour (2009)
 Wonder Girls World Tour (2010)
 Wonder World Tour (2012)

Opening acts
 Jonas Brothers World Tour 2009 (2009)

JYP Nation
JYP Nation (2009)
JYP Nation "Team Play" (2010)
JYP Nation (2011)
JYP Nation "One Mic" (2014)
JYP Nation "Hologram Concert" (2016)
JYP Nation "Mix & Match" (2016)

Awards and nominations

See also
 List of best-selling girl groups

References

External links

 
 
 Wonder Girls discography at MusicTea
 

 
2007 establishments in South Korea
2017 disestablishments in South Korea
English-language singers from South Korea
Grand Prize Seoul Music Award recipients
Japanese-language singers of South Korea
Mandarin-language singers of South Korea
JYP Entertainment artists
K-pop music groups
Korean Mandopop singers
Korean Music Award winners
MAMA Award winners
Musical groups disestablished in 2017
Musical groups established in 2007
Musical groups from Seoul
South Korean dance music groups
South Korean expatriates in the United States
South Korean girl groups
South Korean synthpop groups